Marasmius tageticolor is a species of agaric fungus in the family Marasmiaceae. Its fruit bodies have striped red and white caps. It is found in Mexico, Central America, and South America,amazon rainforest  where it grows on twigs.

Taxonomy
Marasmius tageticolor was first described scientifically by English mycologist Miles Joseph Berkeley in 1856, from collections made in Brazil. He noted "Nothing can be conceived more exquisite than the colouring of this species, which is pretty common. It has the rich tints of the African Marigold." In 1898, Otto Kuntze proposed transferring the fungus to Chamaeceras, a genus that has since been folded into synonymy with Marasmius. M. tageticolor is classified in section Sicci, subsection Siccini, series Leonini of the genus Marasmius.

Description
Its surface colouration features alternating radial rays of red and light buff. The gills are distantly spaced, with about 8–10 gills per fruit body. Red on the upper half near the cap and white on the lower half, they are free from attachment to the stipe. There are short gills (lamellulae) interspersed between some, but not all, of the long gills. There is buff-coloured cottony mycelium at the stipe base.

Spores of Marasmius tageticolor measure 17–19 by 3.5–4 μm. They are smooth, thin-walled, and inamyloid. The basidia (spore-bearing cells) are club-shaped, four-spored, and hyaline (translucent), with dimensions of 26–30 by 7–8 μm.

Habitat and distribution
The fungus grows on small twigs and stipules. It has been recorded from Mexico, Central America, and South America.

In popular culture 
It is featured in the game Satisfactory as an edible mushroom called Bacon Agaric.

See also
List of Marasmius species

References

External links

tageticolor
Fungi of Central America
Fungi of Mexico
Fungi of South America
Fungi described in 1856
Taxa named by Miles Joseph Berkeley
Fungi without expected TNC conservation status